Hypsopygia nannodes is a moth of the family Pyralidae described by Arthur Gardiner Butler in 1879. It is found in Taiwan, Japan and Korea.

Adults are on wing from June to September.

References

Moths described in 1879
Pyralini
Moths of Japan